Taconite Harbor is an unincorporated community in Schroeder Township, Cook County, Minnesota, United States.

The community is located on the North Shore of Lake Superior.

Taconite Harbor is located 33 miles southwest of the city of Grand Marais; and 51 miles northeast of the city of Two Harbors.

Minnesota Highway 61 serves as a main route in the community.

The community of Schroeder is immediately northeast of Taconite Harbor.

Development

Currently, Taconite Harbor consists of a power plant, foundations and an abandoned basketball court. As of 2009, the Minnesota Power Company is looking towards development on an area that they own, but do not need. This development may include a sewer system, various commercial businesses centered on a village square, paved parking lots, and a City Hall (which would then make Taconite Harbor an incorporated city). The community is also expected to be a major stop along the Gitchi-Gami State Trail.

Education
All of the county is zoned to Cook County ISD 166.

References

Unincorporated communities in Cook County, Minnesota
Unincorporated communities in Minnesota
Planned cities in the United States
Minnesota populated places on Lake Superior